Mark Bezos (born ) is an American space tourist and former advertising executive. He is the half-brother of Jeff Bezos, the founder of Amazon, with whom he flew to the edge of space as part of the Blue Origin NS-16 mission on July 20, 2021.

Early life
Mark is 3 years younger than his half-brother Jeff. Mark grew up in Albuquerque, New Mexico; Houston, Texas; and Pensacola, Florida. He finished high school in Norway. He graduated from Texas Christian University in 1992.

Career
After graduation, he worked in the advertising industry, including positions at Saatchi & Saatchi and DDB. His own agency Bezos–Nathonson, founded in 1999, was bought by EastWest Creative in 2005. From 2006 to 2016 he was head of communications at the Robin Hood Foundation, earning $140,000 to $240,000 per year as Robin Hood's communications director, which is supported by his brother and other members of his family.  He founded a private equity firm in 2019.

, he is a director of the Bezos Family Foundation. He owns an unknown stake in his brother's company Amazon; $10,000 of shares he bought in 1996 were estimated to be worth $640 million in 2018.

Personal life 
He is married with four children and lives in Scarsdale, New York, where he is also a volunteer firefighter.

Spaceflight
On July 20, 2021, he flew to the edge of space alongside his brother Jeff, Wally Funk and Oliver Daemen, aboard the Blue Origin NS-16 flight.

References

1968 births
Living people
New Shepard passengers
People who have flown in suborbital spaceflight
Space tourists